The South African Union for Progressive Judaism (SAUPJ) is an affiliate of the World Union for Progressive Judaism and supports 11 progressive congregations. The SAUJP estimates that it represents around 6,000 South African Jews and around 10 per cent of the overall Jewish population residing in South Africa. In 2020 a study by the Institute for Jewish Policy Research showed that 12%  identified as Progressive and that in relative terms the progressive strands are increasing.

Belief and practice

The denomination shares the basic tenets of Reform Judaism (alternatively known also as Progressive or Liberal) worldwide: a theistic, personal God; an ongoing revelation, under the influence of which all scripture was written – but not dictated by providence – that enables contemporary Jews to reach new religious insights without necessarily being committed to the conventions of the past; regarding the ethical and moral values of Judaism as its true essence, while ritual and practical observance are means to achieve spiritual elation and not an end to themselves – and therefore, rejecting the binding nature of Jewish law; a belief in the coming of a Messianic era rather than a personal Messiah, and in immortality of the soul only, instead of bodily resurrection. Prayers referring to such concepts were omitted from the liturgy, and traditional practices abolished or altered considerably.

Jocelyn Hellig, professor of religious studies and one of the best-known interpreters of South African Judaism, wrote about the community in a seminal paper on Jewish practice published in 1987. Hellig described the Progressive community as conservative in religious practice. This was also given as an explanation for the relatively modest presence of Masorti Judaism in the country (Hellig 1987; Shain 2011). The paper also observed that for practical purposes, progressive Jews prefer to go through Orthodox channels to seek and attain divorce (Hellig 1987). The community has traditionally been pro-Zionist and inspired by the founding Rabbi of Progressive Judaism in South Africa, Rabbi Moses Cyrus Weiler, who made Aliyah (Hellig 1987).

Organisational structure
Progressive Judaism has always been relatively smaller in South Africa compared to its American counterpart. South Africa did not experience a significant wave of Jewish migration from Germany, where Reform Judaism and the Haskalah originate (Hellig 1987). It is true that Anglo-German Jewry established the South African Jewish community and later around 6, 500 German Jewish refugees came to South Africa between 1933 and 1942 (Hellig 2009). However, Gustav Saron argues that as the dominant immigrant group, Lithuanian Jews have shaped the essential character of the community (Shain 2011). South African synagogue affiliation has also tended to be more focused on family association rather than on ideological choices (Hellig 1987). Community growth may have also been stymied by the significance of  the non-observant Orthodox, the dominant mode of Jewish religious identification in the country (Hellig 1987; Stier 2004). Therefore, South African Jewish society remains mostly nominally Orthodox.

The Progressive movement in South Africa and the overall South African Jewish population reached its high point in the 1970s with an estimated Jewish population of 120 000 of whom 11 000 identified with the Progressive movement. Today the Jewish population is estimated at between 60 - 70 000 with around 6 000 Progressive Jews. In 2019 the SAUPJ estimates that around 10% of the resident Jewish population identify as Progressive. This may mark a slight proportional increase from a 1998 survey that put the percentage of Progressive Jews at 7% (Shain 2011). However, others estimate that the progressive share of the resident Jewish population was once as high as 20%. Dana Evan Kaplan and Jocelyn Hellig agree upon this figure (Kaplan 2000; Hellig 1987). Milton Shain, one of the most prominent readers of the South African Jewish experience has a more conservative estimate, arguing that during its zenith, Progressive Judaism accounted for a 17% share (Shain 2011).

Kaplan said that challenges for the community have been both emigration and the absence of Progressive Jewish day schools. Kaplan pointed to Australia, which has a similar composition of Jewish society and where the development of such schools has stabilized the progressive community's numbers (Kaplan 2000). However, there are "middle of the road" schools aligned to Orthodoxy such as Yeshiva College of South Africa, King David Schools, Johannesburg and United Herzlia Schools that serve Jewish children of varying practice and commitment (Hellig 1987). Progressive South African Jews are also making use of these day schools overseas. South African children along with their Israeli counterparts form the main immigrant groups of children attending the Akiva School, a Reform-based primary at the Sternberg Centre in London. A 2010 study was commissioned by the Kaplan Centre for Jewish Studies at the University of Cape Town to look at the composition of South African Jewish communities residing in London. In a sample of 314 participants, 16.2% identified as Progressive and 7.3% identified with the other progressive stream of Masorti.

There are 11 progressive congregations, mostly concentrated in South Africa's metropolitan areas; Johannesburg (4), Cape Town (3), Durban (1), Pretoria (1), East London and Port Elizabeth. The most recent congregation is Beit Luria established in 2019 in the Randburg area of Johannesburg. The largest congregation is in Cape Town as the Cape Town Progressive Jewish Congregation (CTPJC) brings together three congregations with a membership of 3, 000. This also makes it the second largest Jewish congregation in the city.

Non-Orthodox conversions to Judaism also take place under the auspices of the SAUPJ. Rabbi Sa'ar Shaked of Beit Emanuel Progressive Synagogue is currently involved in efforts to establish a Rabbinic Academy and Higher Education Institution in Gauteng.

History
The movement was inspired when ethnologist Abraham Zevi Idelsohn visited his family in Johannesburg in September 1929 for his parents’ Golden Wedding anniversary. At the time Idelson was a professor at Hebrew Union College-Jewish Institute of Religion where he gave talks on the nature and principles of Reform Judaism. He urged his brother, Jerry to establish a group for progressive Judaism in Johannesburg. Jerry undertook this task and then joined his brother in Europe where they met several prominent leaders of the Progressive movement such as Lily Montagu. Montagu later sent Liberal Sabbath prayers books to use for services in South Africa.

Jerry then formed a committee in South Africa with Louis Caplan, Dr Louis Freed and Simund Haas. The earlier religious services took place in  private homes in 1930. Jerry then popularized the movement by giving public lectures, writing about Progressive Judaism and speaking to the press. In June 1931 the South African Jewish Religious Union for Liberal Judaism was established with Jerry serving as honorary secretary. Then with the aid of Montagu and his brother, Jerry negotiated with Moses Cyrus Weiler, a student at Hebrew Union College-Jewish Institute of Religion to join the burgeoning movement in South Africa. Weiler arrived in Johannesburg in 1933 after being ordained as a rabbi. A Progressive congregation was then formed with the first service taking place at the Freemasons' Hall. At the end of 1933 the Progressive movement purchased a site in Hillbrow, downtown Johannesburg to build a synagogue. The synagogue, Temple Israel was officially opened in 1936 with Weiler serving as rabbi.

In 1950, The New York Times reported on Weiler's trip to New York where he was speaking at Temple Israel of the City of New York: "It is important that Reform Jewry in the United States take more interest in the welfare of progressive Judaism abroad and embark upon a Reform Jewish Marshall Plan. It should assist the progressive Jewish communities abroad morally and financially"

As in other diaspora communities there have been tensions between the Progressive and Orthodox movements of the country. In 1965 a concordat was signed in Johannesburg between the Chief Rabbis of the two movements agreeing that from "the religious point of view there is an unbridgeable gulf between Orthodoxy and Reform." (Hellig 1987) Progressive leaders have argued that the non-observant Orthodox population observe less than their Progressive counterparts and that they would be more comfortable in the Progressive movement (Hellig 1987).

On 6 August 1983 a limpet mine exploded outside Temple Israel, four hours before State President Marais Viljoen was scheduled to attend a ceremony marking the congregation's 50th anniversary. There were no injuries and the celebration went ahead with Viljoen in attendance. Mahommed Iqbal Shaik of the Dolphin Unit of Umkhonto we Sizwe (MK) later assumed responsibility during the Truth and Reconciliation Commission  hearings and he was granted amnesty.

In 1993 there were divisions when Rabbi Ady Asabi declared both the Beit Emanuel Progressive Synagogue and Imanu-Shalom congregations as independent and Masorti synagogues, breaking with the SAUPJ and Progressive Judaism. A court case ensued to retain both of the congregations under the SAUPJ. Beit Emanuel returned to the SAUPJ following an agreement and Shalom became independent and Masorti (Dubb and Shain 1995).

The SAUPJ took the strongest stand of any of the Jewish movements in the country against apartheid. It opposed disinvestment while women in the movement engaged in social work as a form of protest. This includes the Moses Weiler School in Alexandra where for generations the school has been funded and led by women from the Progressive movement, even in opposition to the Bantu Education Act, 1953 (Feld 2014).

References

Bibliography

External links
SAUPJ official website

1931 establishments in South Africa
Jews and Judaism in Johannesburg
Jews and Judaism in South Africa
Jewish organisations based in South Africa
Jewish organizations established in 1931
Progressive Judaism in South Africa
World Union for Progressive Judaism
Jewish South African history